Tiofilusi Tiueti is a Tongan civil servant, politician, and Cabinet Minister.

Tiueti has previously worked as a civil servant. He was chief executive of Tonga's Ministry of Finance until 2013, when he moved to a position at the World Bank. In May 2015 he was appointed as chief executive of the Pacific Association of Supreme Audit Institutions, a role he held until May 2020. He then served on PASAI's secretariat until September 2022.

On 20 October 2022 he was appointed Minister of Finance, replacing Tatafu Moeaki who had been unseated for bribery.

References

Living people
Tongan civil servants
Finance Ministers of Tonga
Year of birth missing (living people)